21 Engineer Regiment RE is a regiment of the British Army's Royal Engineers. It is based at Claro Barracks, Ripon, Catterick Garrison in Yorkshire.

History 
21 Engineer Regiment was first formed in 1949 at Holzminden to fulfill 7th Armoured Division engineer support requirements as the 21st Field Regiment. In 1958, the regiment was split as the 7th Armoured Division was disbanded and became the new 5th Infantry Division.  As a result of the change the regiment was broken up and became the new 21st Engineer Regiment and the divisional engineer regiment for the 1st Armoured Division.  In 1969 the regiment was reformed as 21 Engineer Regiment.  In 1978 the regiment was renamed to 1st Armoured Division Engineer Regiment.  In 1992 as a result of the Options for Change the division along with the regiment were disbanded, but later reformed in 1993 and the regiment remained in Germany until 2008 when it moved to Ripon. 

15 Field Support Squadron of 21 Engineer Regiment were the first troops to use the Talisman suite of counter-IED tools operationally, in Afghanistan in 2010. As of 25 October 2013, the British Army had 18 Honeywell RQ-16 T-Hawk UAVs in service as part of the Talisman C-IED suite. 

Under Army 2020 the regiment joins the 12 (Force Support) Engineer Group and becomes responsible for Afghanistan operations.

As a result of the Army 2020 Refine, the regiment will move to Catterick and gain a Mechanised Infantry Vehicle variant.

Structure 
Reportedly after the Army 2020 reforms:

 21 Engineer Regiment, in Ripon
 7 Headquarters and Support Squadron
1 Field Squadron
 4 Field Squadron
 29 Field Squadron 
 23 Amphibious Engineer Squadron, Royal Engineers, based at Talbot Barracks Sennelager, Germany<ref>{{Cite web|title= a sub unit from  @75EngrRegt , 23 Amph Engr Sqn provide a Wide Wet Gap Crossing capability for  @DefenceHQ . 
REME Light Aid Detachment

References

External links

Regiments of the Royal Engineers
Military units and formations established in 1949